The 1985 Nottinghamshire County Council election was held on Thursday, 2 May 1985. The whole council of eighty-eight members was up for election and the result was that the Labour Party retained control of the Council, winning forty-eight seats. The Conservatives won thirty-seven councillors and the SDP–Liberal Alliance made gains in terms of percentage vote share, but won just two seats. An Independent councillor was elected in the Retford North division.

Results by division
Each electoral division returned one county councillor. The candidate elected to the council in each electoral division is shown in the table below. "Unopposed" indicates that the councillor was elected unopposed.

References

1985
1985 English local elections
1980s in Nottinghamshire